Deh Now (also Romanized as Dehnow) is a village in Cheshmeh Kabud Rural District, in the Central District of Harsin County, Kermanshah Province, Iran. At the 2006 census, its population was 139, in 30 families.

References 

Populated places in Harsin County